Adam Foti (born 20 February 1984) is an Australian football (soccer) striker with an Italian passport who played for several Cypriot and Greek clubs. He began playing football aged six in Junior Clubs Terry Hils/Bellrose Raiders, Manly-Warringah, Gladesville-Hornsby. Aged 15 he signed for Northern Tigers FC, and in seasons 2002 and 2003 he had 19 caps and 19 goals with this club.

His good appearances in Australia were the reason that he came to Leonidio FC Greece aged 19, where he played half of season 2003–04 with nine caps and one goal.

After he moved in Cyprus, for 1.5 years in Aris Limassol and start showing his scoring skills, having 23 caps and seven goals. The next one-and-a-half years he signed for AEP Paphos where in his first season he was the leading scorer in Cypriot League with 18 goals in 23 games and finished half of season 2006–07 in the same club with 10 caps and 6 goals.

January 2007 he came back to Greece and transferred to Kerkyra FC where he played 13 games and had one goal and finally this December he moved to Cyprus for third time to play for Olympiakos Nicosia (eight games one goal).

External links
 Personal site
 AO Kerkyra profile
 Oz Football profile

1984 births
Living people
Australian people of Italian descent
Australian soccer players
Australian expatriate soccer players
Aris Limassol FC players
AEP Paphos FC players
A.O. Kerkyra players
Olympiakos Nicosia players
Expatriate footballers in Greece
Expatriate footballers in Cyprus
Manly United FC players
Cypriot First Division players
People of Calabrian descent
Association football forwards